The 2019–20 Slovak Cup was the 51st edition of the competition. The tournament began on 20 July 2019 and the final was played on 8 July 2020.

Spartak Trnava were the defending champions, defeating Žilina in the 2019 final.

Slovan Bratislava won their sixteenth Slovak Cup title, defeating Ružomberok in the final.

Format
Matches which were level after regulation advanced to penalties to determine a winner. Each round of the cup was contested over one leg with the exception of the semi-finals which were contested over two legs.

First round
98 matches in the first round were played from 20 July 2019 to 7 August 2019.

|}

Second round
64 matches in the second round were played from 13 August 2019 to 9 October 2019.

|}

Third round
32 matches in the third round were played from 4 September 2019 to 12 October 2019.

|}

Fourth round
16 matches in the fourth round were played from 24 September 2019 to 16 November 2019.

|}

Round of 16
8 matches in the round of 16 were played from 30 October 2019 to 4 December 2019.

|}

Quarter-finals
The draw for the quarter-finals took place on 12 December 2019. Matches were played on 4 March 2020.

|}

Semi-finals
The draw for the semi-finals took place on 26 May 2020.

First leg

Second leg

Final

See also
 2019–20 Slovak First Football League

References

External links 
 soccerway.com

Slovak Cup seasons
Cup
Slovak Cup